Carlos Pérez (born 26 August 1971 in Havana) is a retired Cuban-Hungarian handball player, who played for Veszprém KC and the Hungarian national team.

Career

He was born in Havana and spent his Cuban years by local team Ciudad Havana. He signed to Hungarian top club MKB Veszprém KC in 1997 and since then spent all the seasons with the club.

He obtained Hungarian citizenship in 1999 and made his debut for the national team in 2002 against Slovenia. He represented Hungary at the 2003 World Championship, where he showed his exceptional shooting skills and finished first on the goalscoring charts with 64 goals. He has also been selected to the All-Star team. He participated in the 2004 Summer Olympics a year later and finished fourth.

Despite his good performances he had to wait seven years to appear on another major tournament, this time the 2011 World Championship. As he was permitted by his club to play on three games only, Hungarian head coach Lajos Mocsai saved him for the most important matches, and he was a late call-up to replace Péter Gulyás in the squad.  He was part of the 2012 Summer Olympics Hungarian squad that finished fourth.

He was voted Hungarian Handballer of the Year three times in a row between 2003–2005, and won the award once again in 2011.

Achievements
Nemzeti Bajnokság I:
Winner: 1998, 1999, 2001, 2002, 2003, 2004, 2005, 2006, 2008, 2009, 2010, 2011, 2012
Silver Medalist: 2000, 2007
Magyar Kupa:
Winner: 1998, 1999, 2000, 2002, 2003, 2004, 2005, 2007, 2009, 2010, 2011, 2012
Finalist: 2006, 2008
EHF Champions League:
Finalist: 2002
Semifinalist: 2003, 2006
EHF Cup Winners' Cup:
Winner: 2008
EHF Champions Trophy:
Finalist: 2002, 2008

Individual awards
 Hungarian Handballer of the Year: 2002, 2004, 2005, 2011
 Top Scorer of the World Championship: 2003
 All-Star Left Back of the World Championship (2003)
   Golden Cross of the Cross of Merit of the Republic of Hungary (2012)
 MOB Fair Play Award,  (2014)

References

External links
 Carlos Pérez player profile on MKB Veszprém KC official website
 Carlos Pérez career statistics at Worldhandball

1971 births
Living people
Cuban emigrants to Hungary
Sportspeople from Havana
Hungarian male handball players
Cuban male handball players
Olympic handball players of Hungary
Handball players at the 2004 Summer Olympics
Handball players at the 2012 Summer Olympics